Abdoulaye Traoré (born 29 March 1959) is a Malian athlete. He competed in the men's long jump and the men's triple jump at the 1984 Summer Olympics.

References

External links
 

1959 births
Living people
Athletes (track and field) at the 1984 Summer Olympics
Malian male long jumpers
Malian male triple jumpers
Olympic athletes of Mali
Place of birth missing (living people)
21st-century Malian people